Inevitable Collapse in the Presence of Conviction is NOLA sludge metal band Soilent Green's fifth album, released through Metal Blade Records on April 15, 2008. It was produced by Erik Rutan of Hate Eternal.

Track listing

Track 10 was written in the early 1990s when Glenn Rambo was still alive and a member.

Personnel
Soilent Green
L. Ben Falgoust II – vocals
Brian Patton – guitars
Scott Crochet – bass
Tommy Buckley – drums

Production
Erik Rutan - producer, engineering, mixing
Shawn Ohtani - engineering
Brian Elliot - assistant engineer

References

2008 albums
Soilent Green albums
Metal Blade Records albums
Albums produced by Erik Rutan